Time of arrival (TOA or ToA) is the absolute time instant when a radio signal emanating from a transmitter reaches a remote receiver.
The time span elapsed since the time of transmission (TOT or ToT) is the time of flight (TOF or ToF).
Time difference of arrival (TDOA) is the difference between TOAs.

Usage
Many radiolocation systems use TOA measurements to perform geopositioning via true-range multilateration. The true range or distance can be directly calculated from the TOA as signals travel with a known velocity. TOA from two base stations will narrow a position to a position circle; data from a third base station is required to resolve the precise position to a single point.
TDOA techniques such as pseudorange multilateration use the measured time difference between TOAs.

Ways of synchronization
As with TDOA, synchronization of the network base station with the locating reference stations is important. This synchronization can be done in different ways:

 With exact synchronous clock on both sides. Inaccuracy in the clock synchronization translates directly to an imprecise location.
 With two signals which have different speed. Sound ranging to a lightning strike works this way (speed of light and sound velocity).
 Via measurement to or triggering from a common reference point.
 Without direct synchronisation, but with compensation of clock phase differences,

Two-way ranging
Two-way ranging is a cooperative method for determining the range between two radio transceiver units.  When synchronisation of the oscillators of the involved transmitters is not viable, hence the clocks differ, then applying the measurement as a two ways travel to the receiver and mirrored back to the transmitter compensates for some of the phase differences between the oscillators involved. This concept is applied with the real-time locating system (RTLS) concept as defined in the international standard ISO/IEC FCD 24730-5.

Literature

An introductory description of the concept is given with. In contrast to some faulty explanations, the concept may be applied as well with IEEE 802.15.4aCSS as with IEEE 802.15.4aUWB modulation.

See also
 Angle of arrival
 GSM localization
 Ranging
 Triangulation

References

External links
 Seminar "Security in mobile communication", which was held at the Communication Security (COSY) Group at the Ruhr-University Bochum, Germany

Radio
Wireless locating
Radio geopositioning